Jászfényszaru is a town in Jász-Nagykun-Szolnok county, in the Northern Great Plain region of central Hungary.

Geography
It is the meeting of three regions: the North-Hungary, the North-Plain and the Central region.
The neighbouring towns are: Hatvan, Csány and Boldog (Heves county), Pusztamonostor (Jász-Nagykun-Szolnok county), Zsámbok, Szentlőrinckáta and Tóalmás (Pest county).
Jászfényszaru is at the mouth of Zagyva and Galga rivers. 
The town has 2 twin-cities: Zakliczyn (Poland) and Bors (Romania).

It has the second largest Samsung factory in Europe after the Slovakian one.

Twin towns – sister cities

Jászfényszaru is twinned with:
 Borș, Romania
 Hat, Ukraine
 Kiskunfélegyháza, Hungary
 Zakliczyn, Poland

References

External links

  in Hungarian, English, German and Polish

Populated places in Jász-Nagykun-Szolnok County
Jászság